Two Years Before the Mast is a 1946 adventure film based on Richard Henry Dana Jr.'s travel book of the same name. It stars Alan Ladd, Brian Donlevy, William Bendix, and Barry Fitzgerald.

Plot 

In 1834, Charles Stewart, the spoiled, dissolute son of a shipping magnate, is shanghaied aboard the Pilgrim, one of his father's own ships. He embarks upon a long, hellish sea voyage under the tyrannical rule of Captain Francis Thompson, assisted by his first mate, Amazeen. One of his crewmates is Richard Henry Dana Jr., who will ultimately recount the entire voyage in a book.

Cast 
 Alan Ladd as Charles Stewart
 Brian Donlevy as Richard Henry Dana
 William Bendix as First Mate Amazeen
 Barry Fitzgerald as Terence O'Feenaghty
 Howard da Silva as Captain Thompson
 Esther Fernández as Maria Dominguez
 Albert Dekker as Brown
 Luis van Rooten as 2nd Mate Foster
 Darryl Hickman as Sam Hooper
 Roman Bohnen as Macklin
 Ray Collins as Gordon Stewart
 Theodore Newton as Hayes
 Tom Powers as Bellamer
 James Burke as Carrick
 Frank Faylen as Hansen
 unbilled players include Dorothy Granger, Kitty Kelly, Barry Macollum, Cyril Ring and Duncan Renaldo

Production

Development
In 1936, Republic Studios announced plans to make a version of the film starring James Dunn and produced by Bert Clark. Actor Lew Ayres was mentioned as a possible director and Lionel Barrymore, or, if he refused, Walter Connolly was going to star. The movie was meant to be an attempt by Republic to move into bigger budgeted productions. Negotiations with Barrymore, Connolly and Fredric March fell through and the studio tried to sign Henry Wilcoxon.

Republic never made the movie. Edward Small announced plans to film the book in 1939 under his deal with United Artists. However this was postponed when World War II was declared, as Small was reluctant to make such an expensive film in an uncertain marketplace. Plans to film the book were again announced in 1940 and 1941 but no movie resulted. Paramount eventually bought the rights off Small in 1943, including a script Seton I Miller had written for the producer in 1939; Miller had since become a writer and producer at Paramount. Alan Ladd was announced as star.

Pre-Production
In March 1944 it was announced Ladd would be re-inducted into the army but that this would be delayed so he could make Mast.

Brian Donlevy was originally going to play the sadistic captain but was given the role of Dana instead. Howard da Silva, who had just achieved fame playing Judd in Oklahoma! on Broadway, played the captain.

Mexican film star Esther Fernández had been signed to Paramount for two years without making a film. John Farrow watched some test footage she made and was impressed; she was brought back to play the female lead.

Due to war time restrictions – notably lack of transport – Paramount had endured many logistical difficulties filming the pirate movie Frenchman's Creek on location. This prompted them to decide to shoot Two Years Before the Mast entirely within the confines of the studio. Seascapes and soundscapes from Paramount's Souls at Sea (1937) were re-used.

The film heavily dramatised the novel but attempted to be faithful. "Dana's tale is so well known that we shall have to stay close to the line of his yarn", said John Farrow, "Especially in the characters." Extensive research was done on the project for six months prior to shooting.

Shooting
Filming began in May 1944 and took 69 days. "We could do it in less but we've got to allow stubble to grow", said Farrow. "Chins have got to grow over with gray plush. May cost a hundred thousand. Depends on how long it takes those chins to sprout. But meantime, we can be shooting storms and Miss Fernandez."

Alan Ladd injured his back during filming and had to miss a week of shooting.

The movie was shot on three studio sound stages. Four stage were combined into one, for the interiors. There was another stage holding the water tank. Two models of the ship were built at a total cost of $150,000. Paramount were so pleased with Da Silva's performance they signed him to a seven-year contract. Darryl Hickman, who played the cabin boy, also impressed and was signed to a long-term contract.

Release
The film was not released until late 1946, after the release of several films Ladd made subsequent to Mast: Salty O'Rourke, The Blue Dahlia and O.S.S.. This also meant that Barry Fitzgerald, who became a star in Going My Way (1944) while the film was waiting for release, was upped to above the title billing.

Box office
Two Years Before the Mast was one of the most popular films released in the US that year, Los Angeles Times describing it as "a phenomenal hit". Variety listed it as the tenth most popular movie of 1946.

References

External links

 
Review of film at New York Times
Review of film at Variety

Films directed by John Farrow
1946 films
1940s historical adventure films
1940s adventure drama films
American adventure comedy films
American historical romance films
American black-and-white films
Films scored by Victor Young
Films based on American novels
Films set in the 1830s
Paramount Pictures films
Seafaring films
Films set in Boston
Films based on diaries
1946 drama films
1940s English-language films
1940s American films